Frank Marshall King (November 28, 1883May 29, 1959), was a Spanish, Catalan pianist and pedagogue born to parents of English heritage.

Marshall was born in Mataró, Catalonia, Spain.  He attended the Conservatori Superior de Música del Liceu and then began studying with Enrique Granados. Marshall and Granados became close musical associates, and Marshall became Granados's teaching assistant at the latter's academy.

When Granados died in 1916, Marshall became its director; he remained director until his death in 1959, and the institute's name was eventually changed to Académia Frank Marshall. Among his pupils at the school was the composer Vicente Asencio. He published two pedagogic works, Estudio práctico sobre los pedales del piano (Madrid, 1919) and La sonoridad del piano, which attempted to notate piano pedaling more precisely.

Marshall's influence as a pianist and teacher impacted Catalan piano playing heavily; his approaches to pedaling and voicing helped refine the distinctive style of piano playing from the region. No. 3 of Federico Mompou's Cançons i danses was dedicated to him. His most famous student was Alicia de Larrocha. Also the Catalan pianist Albert Attenelle, who premiered Federico Mompou's Variations on a Theme of Chopin.

Marshall died in Barcelona in 1959, aged 75.

References
Charles Hopkins, "Frank Marshall". The New Grove Dictionary of Music and Musicians online.

1883 births
1959 deaths
Spanish classical pianists
Male classical pianists
Conservatori Superior de Música del Liceu alumni
20th-century classical pianists
20th-century Spanish male musicians
20th-century Spanish musicians
Spanish people of English descent
Piano pedagogues